Ambaji ropeway is a ropeway on Gabbar hill in Ambaji, Banaskantha district, Gujarat, India. It was opened in 1998.

History
Ambaji is a major pilgrim town because of presence of the Ambaji Temples on foothill as well as on the Gabbar hill, a Shakti Peetha. Shri Arasuri Ambaji Mata Devasthan Trust which manages these temples installed the ropeway in 1998 and leased it to Usha Breco Limited.

See also
 Aerial lift in India
 Girnar ropeway
 Pavagadh ropeway
 Saputara ropeway

References

1998 establishments in Gujarat
Transport in Gujarat
Aerial tramways in India
Buildings and structures in Gujarat
Tourist attractions in Banaskantha district
Transport infrastructure completed in 1998